It Was Almost Like a Song is the eighth studio album by American country music artist Ronnie Milsap. It was released in 1977 by RCA Records. The album produced two #1 hits for Milsap, including the title track, which marked his debut on the Adult Contemporary chart, peaking at #7 and reaching #16 on the Billboard 100. "What a Difference You've Made in My Life," was the other #1 single, it was re-recorded for his 2009 album Then Sings My Soul.

It Was Almost Like a Song reached #3 on Country album charts and broke the Top 100 of the Billboard 200, peaking at #97. It was ultimately certified as Gold. The album won "Album of the Year" at the 1978 Country Music Association Awards.

Allmusic described the album as Milsap's "breakthrough pop album" commenting that "the music here changed what radio programmers would accept" enabling the "chance" to "crossover."

Track listing

Production
Produced By Ronnie Milsap & Tom Collins
Engineers: Bill Harris Quintet, Les Ladd, David McKinley, Al Pachucki, Chuck Seitz

Personnel
Drums: Hayward Bishop, Kenny Malone
Vibraphone: Farrell Morris
Harmonica: Charlie McCoy
Bass guitar: Johnny Cobb, Mike Leech, Jack Williams
Piano: Shane Keister, Ronnie Milsap, Hargus "Pig" Robbins
Acoustic Guitar: Jimmy Capps, Ray Edenton, Chip Young
Electric Guitar: Peter Bordonali, Glenn Keener, Jack Watkins, Reggie Young
Steel Guitar: Dick Overbey, Hal Rugg
Fiddle: Tommy Williams
Lead Vocals: Ronnie Milsap
Background Vocals: The Lea Jane Singers
Strings Arrangements: Cam Mullins (tracks 3,4,5,10), D. Bergen White (tracks 1,7,9)

Chart

Singles

References
Erlewine, Stephen. [ It Was Almost Like a Song], Allmusic.

1977 albums
Ronnie Milsap albums
RCA Records albums